A studio apartment, also known as a studio flat (UK), a self-contained apartment (Nigeria), efficiency apartment, bed-sitter (Kenya) or bachelor apartment, is a small apartment (rarely a condo) in which the normal functions of a number of rooms – often the living room, bedroom, and kitchen – are combined into a single room.

Design 

The studio apartment is an apartment with a single room. They are also known as single-room dwelling places or studio flats. A studio apartment typically consists of one large room that serves as the combined living, dining, and bedroom. A variation, sometimes called an "alcove studio", may have a very small separate area; this wing or nook is off the main area, and can be used for dining or sleeping. The apartment's kitchen facilities may be located either in the central room or in a small separate area. The bathroom is usually in its own smaller room, while the toilet can be separated.

Studio apartment sizes vary considerably by country. 

A studio apartment differs from a bedsitter in the United Kingdom or single room occupancy (SRO) unit in the United States, in that an SRO does not usually contain a kitchen or bathroom. Bathroom facilities are shared with multiple units on the hall.

Global variations 
 Argentina In Argentina, a studio apartment is called "monoambiente" (in Spanish, "Mono" is one and "ambiente" is room).

 Austria In Austria, a studio apartment is traditionally called Garçonnière (derived from French garçon, meaning boy, young man, or bachelor) (commonly spelled Garconniere); the term "Einzimmerwohnung" (literally one-room apartment) is also widely used. Garconnieres are usually between 20 and 40 square meters (215 - 430 ft²), and consist of a combined bathroom and toilet, the main room with a kitchenette, and a small antechamber ("Vorzimmer") connecting the two and leading to the corridor and stairwell outside the apartment. Garconnieres in large tenements were the typical homes of workers, and often their families, during and after the "Gründerzeit" ("founders' period"), the time of industrialization in the 19th century in Austria in Germany. Many pre-WWII Garconnieres even today don't provide bathroom facilities of their own but facilities that are shared by all residents on the floor, whereas more modern Garconnieres are fully equipped.
 Brazil In Brazil, a studio apartment is called "quitinete" (from kitchenette) or "quarto-e-sala" (literally, bedroom and [living] room). It is basically composed of one room, one bathroom, and a kitchen, which is often in the same space as the room. Lately, newly built quitinetes are starting to be called "studios", for the modern appeal English as a foreign language has.

 Canada In Canada, a bachelor apartment, or simply "bachelor," is the common term in Canadian English for any single room dwelling unit which is not a shared accommodation. A shared room, or particularly small bachelor, is sometimes referred to as a "bachelorette." Residents of the province of Quebec (most in French) widely use the term "studio" or "one and a half".
 Czech Republic In the Czech Republic, garsoniéra, often referred to as garsonka, (from French "garçon", meaning boy, young man, bachelor) is a one room apartment with separate bathroom and WC, abbreviated as 1+0, sometimes it is 1 room with separate bathroom and WC and kitchenette, abbreviated 1+KK.
Denmark In Denmark, they refer to a studio apartment as a "one room apartment" (1 værelses lejelighed). A studio apartment is not to be confused with a study apartment in Danish, which is accommodations that you are only allowed to rent if you are a student. These are often very cheap but in a rather good condition, close to a higher education facility and very small. Rarely larger than 40 square meters.
 Finland In Finland, a studio apartment is called yksiö (from the word "yksi" meaning "one"), and are advertised as one-room apartments (a one-bedroom apartment is referred to as "two rooms"). The building of such apartments is a growing trend throughout Finland; 55% of new homes in the city of Turku are studio apartments with total areas of under 37 square metres. Between 1970 and 2020, the percentage of one-person households in Finland has almost tripled, from 15.7% to 45.3%.

 Germany In Germany, studio apartments are called Einzimmerwohnungen ("Ein" means one, "Zimmer" means room, and "Wohnung" means apartment).
The size of the living area could be just around a car park size.
 Italy In Italy, Italians call them "monolocale", meaning "one room". There is only one room with a kitchenette, and a separate bathroom.
 Jamaica In Jamaica, studio apartments are commonly referred to as quads, and are a common feature in Eastern Kingston. They generally consist of one main room, acting as the living room, dining room and bedroom. The kitchen exists within the same room, with partitioning wall. The bathroom is in a smaller room, by itself. These studio apartments generally come with adequate yard space and washing facilities (on the outdoors). They have a bed, a stove and a TV too.
 Japan Japan has an even smaller variation of the studio apartment known as the one room mansion.
 Kenya In Kenya, they are commonly known as a bed-sitter. Rent varies from KSh.5,000 – 10,000/=, the equivalent of US$48.61 – 97.22. They are common places for young people to live when they start working.
 New Zealand In New Zealand, studio apartments are known as studio rooms, and they frequently feature a bedroom with study area and an en-suite bathroom. Spaces such as kitchen, lounge and dining area are communal between other people staying in that apartment.
 Nigeria In Nigeria, Studio apartments are known as "room self-contain apartments". These apartments typically have a single room, which serves as the living room and bedroom, a kitchen, a bathroom and a toilet (which is often merged with the bathroom). This form of housing is quite different from Face to Face housing, which are normally built facing each other, and with shared toilet(s), bathroom(s) and kitchen space.
 North Macedonia In North Macedonia, garsonjera (Гарсоњера) derived from the French "garçonnière". Normally a one room plus separate bathroom, sometimes with a very small, separate kitchen.
 Norway In Norway, studio apartments in are called "1-romsleilighet", "one-room-apartment" in English, because they count both the living room and the bedrooms. Hence an apartment with one bedroom is called a "two-room-apartment" (2-romsleilighet).
 Portugal In Portugal, studio apartments are designated T0 (T-Zero). This designation follows the Portuguese house classification system, where apartments are classified by their typology as Tx, with the "x" representing the number of independent bedrooms. In the case of the T0, the "0" means that the apartment has no independent bedrooms.
 Poland In Poland, studio apartments are called "kawalerka" (from the word "kawaler" – a bachelor).
 Romania In Romania, studio apartment is known as "garsonieră", a word derived from the French "garçonnière". They are usually one room plus a separate bathroom, sometimes with a small, separate kitchen.
 Russia In the building codes and regulations and standards of the Russian Federation, the concept of "studio apartment" is not defined, therefore it is not possible to give an exact definition of this concept. In colloquial Russian, there is a word "studiya", which means apartments with a combined bedroom and kitchen area. Russian studio apartments are represented in different segments of real estate. In economy class, these are flats of small square footage. But studio apartments also exist on a large area, and even in elite flats. In the secondary housing market, there are studios obtained by redevelopment of apartments such as Khrushchyovka and Brezhnevkas, in which the partitions between the living room and the small kitchen and hallway are removed.
 Singapore In Singapore, studio apartments, in the context of Singapore's public housing, are flats that are specifically built by the Housing and Development Board to cater to the growing senior citizen population. One must be at least 55 years old to purchase these studio apartments. Since August 2015, the scheme was replaced by 2-room Flexi flats, which gives seniors the flexibility to select a lease period that suits them best.
 SlovakiaIn Slovakia, studio apartments are called garsoniéra, often referred to as garzónka or sometimes garzónka, a word from French "garçon", meaning boy. This type of studio apartment is usually a one room apartment where living room and kitchenette is combined into one room. Bathroom and toilet are usually separated. If the kitchen is separated by a wall or doors, it's called 1+1. Studio apartments in Slovakia can usually be found in Slovak housing estates (sídlisko), but they might also be in other places.
 South Korea In South Korea, studio apartments are called officetels or one rooms.
 Sweden In Sweden, studio apartments are called an etta, "a one". Usually between 20–40 m².

 United Kingdom In the United Kingdom (British), a studio flat is usually a single room with cooking facilities which has its own bathroom attached. Traditionally, if a dwelling has a shared bathroom, it is known as a bedsit. This distinction is encountered less frequently, as are bedsits themselves (especially in large cities) due to the consequences of the Housing Act 1989 discouraging landlords from offering this once widespread type of accommodation.
 United States In the United States, the average size is 500 to 600 sq ft (46–56 square meters). In general in the US, the term "studio apartment" denotes a slightly larger apartment, typically with a separate kitchen, dining area, bathroom, and often an alcove and/or walk-in closet(s), whereas "efficiency apartment" indicates a one-room apartment with a kitchenette built into one of the walls, but typically still with a private bathroom (as opposed to one shared with other tenants, which would be an SRO). A variation common in New York City is the "L-shaped" or "alcove" studio, in which the central room branches off into a small alcove that can be used for sleeping or dining.

See also 

Bachelor pad
The L-Shaped Room (novel)

References 

Apartment types